Porvenir (also Daniel and Polaris) is a ghost town in Presidio County, Texas, United States.

History
After Texas Rangers murdered 15 Mexican-American residents on January 28, 1918, in the Porvenir massacre, Porvenir was abandoned.

Notes

External links
 
 

Unincorporated communities in Presidio County, Texas
Unincorporated communities in Texas